Avianca Böhm (born 1 January 1990) is a South African-born New Zealand actress, model and former beauty pageant titleholder.

Avianca Bohm was crowned “Miss New Zealand 2012″ by Priyani Puketapu (Miss New Zealand 2011) at the grand finale of Miss New Zealand 2012 beauty pageant at the Amora Hotel, Wellington, New Zealand on Sunday, 3 June 2012. Bohm was representing Auckland although she did not meet the requirements (New Zealand citizenship) of the Miss Universe pageant for which the winner automatically qualifies.

There was dispute as to whether the judges were aware of this ineligibility. Bohm refused to step down despite being informed of her ineligibility. There was significant backlash from the New Zealand public over the possibility of "fast-tracking" of her citizenship on these grounds alone; some have credited this to a dislike of "celebrity exception" within New Zealand culture.

On 31 July 2012 Böhm was stripped of her crown, which was then awarded to pageant runner-up Talia Bennett.

References

External links
Miss New Zealand

1990 births
Living people
Miss New Zealand winners
South African emigrants to New Zealand